For a list of Hillary Clinton 2016 presidential campaign endorsements, see:

 List of Hillary Clinton 2016 presidential campaign political endorsements
 List of Hillary Clinton 2016 presidential campaign non-political endorsements
 List of Hillary Clinton 2016 presidential campaign celebrity endorsements
 List of Hillary Clinton 2016 presidential campaign screen and stage performer endorsements